The Dove may refer to:

The Dove (1927 film), a silent film starring Norma Talmadge, Noah Beery, and Gilbert Roland
The Dove (1968 film), a short parody of Ingmar Bergman's works
The Dove (1974 film), a biographical movie about an around-the-world sailor
The Dove (fairy tale), written in 1634 by Giambattista Basile
The Dove, Hammersmith, public house in Hammersmith, London
The Dove (glacier), a small glacier located in Rocky Mountain National Park, Colorado, United States
"The Dove", nickname of radio station WDUV
Maryland Dove, a replica of the ship The Dove, which was used in founding the Province of Maryland
Al-Yamamah arms deal, the name of a series of record arms sales by the United Kingdom to Saudi Arabia

See also
Dove (disambiguation)
Doves Press